Germano Antônio Rigotto (born 24 September 1949, in Caxias do Sul) is a Brazilian politician currently affiliated to the MDB.

He was the Governor of Rio Grande do Sul state until 1 January 2007. He ran for a second term in October 2006 elections, but he was unexpectedly defeated by Olívio Dutra and Yeda Crusius. Rigotto placed third by a small margin: 0.17% behind Olivio Dutra. In August 2018, Rigotto was nominated as vice presidential candidate along with Henrique Meirelles for the 2018 elections.

References

External links 

 

Governors of Rio Grande do Sul
1949 births
Living people
People from Caxias do Sul
Brazilian people of Italian descent
Members of the Chamber of Deputies (Brazil) from Rio Grande do Sul
Brazilian Democratic Movement politicians
Federal University of Rio Grande do Sul alumni

Candidates for Vice President of Brazil